Michael Hicks is a former American football running back who played two seasons with the Chicago Bears of the National Football League.

References

1973 births
Living people
People from Barnesville, Georgia
Sportspeople from the Atlanta metropolitan area
Players of American football from Georgia (U.S. state)
American football running backs
South Carolina State Bulldogs football players
Chicago Bears players